Douglas Kiker (January 7, 1930 – August 14, 1991) was an American author and newspaper and television reporter whose career spanned three decades.

Kiker was born in Griffin, Georgia. He first gained national attention for his book "The Southerner," published in 1957 and followed by "Strangers on the Shore". Later, he became director of information for the Peace Corps, serving from 1961 until 1963.  He left the government and became a reporter for the New York Herald Tribune newspaper and in his first week on the job rode in the press bus in the motorcade of President John F. Kennedy when Kennedy was assassinated in Dallas, Texas. By 1966, NBC News had taken notice of his varied background and hired him as a correspondent.  He would remain with that network for the rest of his life.

Kiker became distinguished for his numerous assignments over the years for NBC. Perhaps his best-known work was covering military conflicts in Southeast Asia (namely Vietnam) and the Mideast (particularly the Iranian Revolution); during much of that time, he served as NBC's Rome bureau chief, with a territory encompassing most of Europe and western Asia. He received the Peabody Award in 1970 for his coverage of the Black September in Jordan conflict.

But Kiker also excelled at domestic stories, as well, including the civil rights movement and U.S. politics.  He reported from Walter Reed Army Medical Center on the 1969 death of President Dwight Eisenhower.  He was also the commentator on the August 9, 1974 live broadcast of President Richard Nixon's departure from office in disgrace from the Watergate scandal. Kiker filed reports for David Brinkley's documentaries and short-lived newsmagazines during the 1970s, in addition to his regular work on NBC Nightly News, where he occasionally anchored on the weekends.  Kiker worked as a floor reporter during NBC's coverage of the 1972 political conventions and was Washington editor for Today in the mid- to late 1970s.

In the early 1980s, Kiker did a report critical of radio personality Howard Stern, just as Stern was leaving a Washington D.C. station to join WNBC-AM in New York.

Despite the success of his 1950s novels, Kiker did not return to book length fiction until later in his life, when he wrote three mystery novels, "Murder on Clam Pond" (published in 1986), "Death at the Cut" (1988), and "Death Below Deck" (1991). The mysteries were set on Cape Cod and featured reporter Mac McFarland. They received considerable critical acclaim.

According to obituaries in The New York Times and other major newspapers, Douglas Kiker died in his sleep, apparently from a heart attack, while vacationing at his beloved Cape Cod summer home in Chatham, Massachusetts. He was 61. He was survived by his wife, one daughter, and four sons.

References

External links
Archived 1988 The New York Times review of Kiker's Death at the Cut

1930 births
1991 deaths
American television reporters and correspondents
American television news anchors
American war correspondents
American war correspondents of the Vietnam War
American male journalists
NBC News people
People from Griffin, Georgia
20th-century American journalists